, provisional designation , is a trans-Neptunian object located in the Kuiper belt in the outermost region of the Solar System, approximately  in diameter. It was discovered on 16 March 2013, by American astronomers Scott Sheppard and Chad Trujillo at the CTIO in Chile. Numbered in 2018, this minor planet has not been named.

Orbit and classification 

 is a trans-Neptunian object (TNO), located beyond the orbit of Neptune (30.1 AU). The Johnston's archive classifies it as an unspecific "other TNO", meaning that the minor planet is neither a resonant nor a classical TNO. Taking the mean of the two magnitudes, and using the standard 0.25 ~ 0.05 range for minor planets of unknown albedo, a wide 335 to 748 km spread can be estimated for the diameter.

 orbits the Sun at a distance of 37.6–58.7 AU once every 334 years and 1 month (122,013 days; semi-major axis of 48.14 AU). Its orbit has an eccentricity of 0.22 and an inclination of 14° with respect to the ecliptic.

The body's observation arc begins with a precovery taken by the Sloan Digital Sky Survey on 20 February 2001, over 10 years prior to its official discovery observation at Cerro Tololo. The object was first announced on 2 April 2014, when American astronomers Scott Sheppard and Chad Trujillo at the CTIO in Chile published their observations in a Minor Planet Electronic Circular. At the time the object was at 49 AU from the Sun and had an apparent magnitude of 21.1.  The Pan-STARRS-1 survey at the Haleakala Observatory, Hawaii, in the United States also found precovery observations of 2013 FZ27 after 2013 FZ27 was announced and reported them to the Minor Planet Center at a later date.

Numbering and naming 

This minor planet was numbered by the Minor Planet Center on 25 September 2018.  The body was given the wrong discovery credit in the initial MPC Circular and The Minor Planet Center issued an Errata on April 6, 2019 on MPC 112429 correcting the mistake and gives the discovery credit of 2013 FZ27 to Scott S. Sheppard and Chad Trujillo. As of August 2019, it has not been named.

Physical characteristics

Diameter and albedo 

According to Michael Brown and the Johnston's archive,  measures 561 and 584 kilometers in diameter, based on an absolute magnitude of 4.6 and 4.4 respectively. Both sources assume a standard albedo of 0.09 for the body's surface. As of 2018, no physical characteristics have been determined from photometric observations. The body's rotation period, pole and shape remain unknown.

See also 
 List of Solar System objects most distant from the Sun

Notes

References

External links 
 MPEC 2014-G07 : 2013 FZ27, Minor Planet Electronic Circular
 Discovery Circumstances: Numbered Minor Planets (520001)-(525000) – Minor Planet Center
 
 

523671
523671
523671
20101215